Mia Marvin (November 1, 1904 – September 27, 1992) was an American actress best known for her role in The Public Enemy as the woman who houses and seduces James Cagney. In her entire film career spanning five years she appeared in only three films but never in a credited role.

Marvin was the daughter of William Thatcher Marvin and granddaughter of Col. E. J. C. Kewen, California's first attorney general. When she was nine years old, an article in the Los Angeles Sunday Times recognized her for having written two songs and taught herself to play the violin.

Before she became an actress, Marvin was a danseuse. Her work on stage included acting in No, No, Nanette (1925), Ladies All (1931), and Elmer the Great (1931) in San Francisco and So This Is London (1927) in Los Angeles.

Marvin was married to Maurice G. Luxford.

Filmography

References

External links
 
 The Public Enemy DVD Commentary track

1904 births
1992 deaths
Actresses from Los Angeles
American film actresses
20th-century American actresses
American stage actresses
American musical theatre actresses